Benton, Washington may refer to:

 Benton County, A county in the U.S. state Washington
 Benton City, City in Benton County